Stanley Fung Shui-fan (born June 1, 1945) is a Hong Kong actor and film director known for playing comedic roles. He was one of the Lucky Stars.

Career 
In 1967, Fung became an actor in Hong Kong films. Fung first appeared in To Rose with Love, a 1967 Action film directed by Chor Yuen. In 1974, Fung became a director and writer. Fung's directorial debut was with The Looks of Hong Kong, a 1974 Mandarin Drama film. Fung is credited with over 135 films as an actor, 10 films as a director, 4 films as a writer and 3 films as a producer.

Filmography

Films 
 1967 To Rose with Love 
 1968 Du yan xia 
 1968 Won't You Give Me a Kiss? 
 1968 Right to Love 
 1968 Yu nu tian ding 
 1968 Xia sheng 
 1968 Young, Pregnant and Unmarried - Fung Chi-Wai
 1969 Man Li Man Li Wo Ai Ni - King of Alishan
The Fragrant Sword (1969)
 1969 Wise Wives and Foolish Husbands 
 1969 The Joys and Sorrows of Youth 
 1969 Cong ming tai tai ben zhang fu (1969)
 1969 Tian long bao 
The Prodigal (1969)
Yu mian sha xing (1969)
Ming jian Tian Jiao (1969)
Huan le ren sheng (1970)
Zong you yi tian zhuo dao ni (1970)
Cai Li Fo yong qin se mo (1970)
The Singing Killer (1970)
Fei xia shen dao (1971)
The Comet Strikes (1971)
Feng kuang sha shou (1971) - Kung Chao Nan
The Deadly Duo (1971)
Mad Killer (1971)
Jin xuan feng (1972)
Pi li shen shun (1972)
Xiao lao hu (1973) - Kao Dai-liang
Dai heung lei (1974)
Tian tang (1974)
Xiang Gang wu yan xia (1974) - Shi-di Fen-hung
Xiang Gang chao ren (1975)
Lover's Destiny (1975) - Warlord Chang
Bruce: Hong Kong Master (1975)
Ba bai zhuang shi (1976)
The Return of the Condor Heroes (1976, TV Series)
The Proud Youth (1978) - Lo Chao-Jun
The Twins (1979, TV Series) - Kong Bik-hok
Don't Look Now (1980, TV Series) - Gor (1980)
In Love and War (1981, TV Mini-Series) - Yeung Seung-su
No One Is Innocent (1981, TV Mini-Series) - Monatan
Security Unlimited (1981) - Fan
To Hell with the Devil (1981) - Imp
Yue nan zi (1982)
Xue zhong xue (1983)
Winners and Sinners (1983) - Rookie
Oh! My Cops (1983)
Bai yan mei (1983)
Mad Mad 83 (1983)
Radio Tycoon (1983, TV Series) - Yan Ka-ying
Feng shui er shi nian (1983) - Feng Tsui Fan
Pom Pom (1984) - Cameo appearance
My Darling Genie (1984) - Uncle Fan
United We Stand (1984, TV Series) - Lui Jen-kong
Intellectual Trio (1984) - Chan's Superior
Wheels on Meals (1984) - Motorcycle Punk (uncredited)
Yau friend mou ging (1984) - Fung Wah
Dian feng kuang long (1984)
Lai xin sha zhan (1984)
Owl vs. Dumbo (1984) - Inspector Fung / Uncle Chung
My Lucky Stars (1985) - Rawhide / Rhino
Shi lai yun dao (1985) - Uncle Chiu (Lung's father)
From the Great Beyond (1985)
Twinkle, Twinkle Lucky Stars (1985) - Rawhide / Rhino
Unforgettable Fantasy (1985) - Jiu-Fu
Where's Officer Tuba? (1986) - Police Band Drummer
Gui gan you yuan (1986) - Lulu's Grandfather
The Lunatics (1986) - Dr. Tsui
Lucky Stars Go Places (1986) - Rawhide / Rhino
Nui ji za pai jun (1986) - Detective
Pom Pom Strikes Back (1986) - Sick Man in Television
Mr. Vampire II (1986) - Archaeologist
Bi gui zhuo (1986) - Fan Pien-Chou 
Sweet Surrender (1986)
Huan le ren zu (1987)
Lan du ying xiong (1987)
The Romancing Star (1987) - Uncle Ken
Cheng chong chui lui chai (1987) - Uncle Ken
Quan li fan tan (1987) - Canteen operator
Call Girl 1988 (1988) - Fang
The Romancing Star II (1988) - Uncle Ken
Shyly Spirit (1988) - Captain Hao
Dragons Forever (1988) - Psychiatrist (uncredited)
Love Soldier of Fortune (1988) - Go San-Liu
The Crazy Companies (1988) - Frank
The Inspector Wears Skirts (1988) - Inspector Kan
Watch Out (1988) - Lulu's Grandfather
Bet on Fire (1988) - V7 Guy No. 2
Chou tan qi ge ban (1988)
How to Pick Girls Up (1988) - Fei Changfan
The Dragon Family (1988) - Fung
Yes, Madam 2 (1988) - Airport Security Officer
Da hua shen tan (1988)
The Crazy Companies II (1988) - Frank
Ye feng kuang (1989)
The Inspector Wears Skirts 2 (1989) - Kan
They Came to Rob Hong Kong (1989) - Yuen
Armageddon (1989)
Return of the Lucky Stars (1989) - Rhino
Vampire Buster (1989) - Councillor Stephen Kai
Dan shen gui zu (1989)
Iceman Cometh (1989) - Santa Claus
Cheng shi pan guan (1989) - Kam Shing
Shi mian mai fu (1989)
The Romancing Star III (1989) - Uncle Ken
Haunted Jail House (1990) - Feng
Ghostly Vixen (1990) - Thrill Seeker from Hong Kong
Figures from Earth (1990) - Master Thunderbolt
Look Out, Officer! (1990) - Chin
Jing cha pa shou liang jia qin (1990)
The Inspector Wears Skirts III (1990) - Inspector Kan
Blood Stained Tradewinds (1990) - Uncle Drunk
Family Day (1990)
The Gambling Ghost (1991) - Motorcycle Cop
Devil's Vindata (1991) - Principal You Tse-Nam
Spiritually a Cop (1991)
Ghost Punting (1992) - Rawhide
The Musical Vampire (1992) - The Master Mah Mah-Tay
Ghost in Me (1992) - Dai Lan Choi
Thrilling Story (1993)
How to Meet the Lucky Stars (1996) - Rhino Skin
Love Is a Many Stupid Thing (2004)
Hooked On You (2007) - Miu's Dad
Vengeance (2009) - Tony
Accident (2009) - Uncle
I Love Hong Kong (2011) - Ng Tung
I Love Hong Kong 2012 (2012) - Kwok Ching
Marry a Perfect Man (2012)
Tai Chi 0 (2012) - Grand Uncle
Tai Chi Hero (2012) - Grand Uncle
I Love Hong Kong 2013 (2013)
Mortician (2013) - Mr. Wang
Little Big Master (2015) - Yuen Tin Kindergarten Chancellor
ATM (2015)
Robbery (2015)
Buddy Cops (2016)
Ying ging hing dai (2016) - Philip Chan
Edge of Innocence (2017) - Mr. Jiang
Our Time Will Come (2017)
Shen ye shi tang (2019) - Uncle Zhong

References

External links

 Stanley Fung Shui Fan at hkcinemagic.com
 Stanley Fung Shiu-Fan at lovehkfilm.com

Hong Kong male film actors
Hong Kong film directors
Living people
1945 births
Hong Kong male television actors
People from Foshan
Male actors from Guangdong
Film directors from Guangdong
Chinese film directors
Chinese male film actors
Chinese male television actors
20th-century Chinese male actors
21st-century Chinese male actors
20th-century Hong Kong male actors
21st-century Hong Kong male actors
Comedy film directors